Thai royal and noble titles may refer to:

Thai royal ranks and titles
Noble titles of the Thai nobility